Elliot Gant (March 21, 1926 – March 12, 2016) was an American garment businessman, and an executive for the retailer Gant.

Life 
He was born in Brooklyn, the son of Bernard Gantmacher. He served in the United States Navy in World War II. He graduated from University of Connecticut. He developed the family shirt business. They operated a factory in New Haven. They sold the business to Consolidated Foods in 1968.

He died in Boston.

References

External links 
 http://www.ivy-style.com/elliot-gant-1926-2016.html

1926 births
2016 deaths
University of Connecticut alumni